Galerita bicolor, also known as the False bombardier beetle, is a species of beetle occurring in the eastern United States. Its mimicry of the colors and shape of a bombardier beetle help it evade predators.

References

 
http://bugguide.net/node/view/3318

Dryptinae
Beetles described in 1773
Taxa named by Dru Drury